Hoanghonius is a genus of adapiform primate that lived in Asia during the middle Eocene.

References

Literature cited

 

Prehistoric strepsirrhines
Eocene mammals of Asia
Fossil taxa described in 1930
Eocene primates
Prehistoric primate genera